Yanal Abaza (born 1 May 1976) is a retired Syrian footballer who played as a defender.

He represented the Syria national team between 2000 and 2002, earning 12 caps.  He made four appearances in the 2002 West Asian Championship that was hosted in Syria. As well as having three separate spells with Syrian Premier League club Al-Wahda, Abaza played in the Jordan League for Al-Wahdat and the Syrian First Division for Al-Nidhal. Yanal is an ethnic Circassian. He retired in August 2010.

References

External links
 

1976 births
Living people
Syrian footballers
Syrian expatriate footballers
Syrian people of Circassian descent
Syrian people of Abkhazian descent
Expatriate footballers in Jordan

Association football defenders
Syrian Premier League players
Syria international footballers